Grosseto is a city and comune in the central Italian region of Tuscany, the capital of the Province of Grosseto.

It is the most populous city in Maremma, with 82,284 inhabitants. The comune of Grosseto includes the frazioni of Marina di Grosseto, the largest one, Roselle, Principina a Mare, Principina Terra, Montepescali, Braccagni, Istia d'Ombrone, Batignano, Alberese and Rispescia.

History
The origins of Grosseto can be traced back to the High Middle Ages. It was first mentioned in 803 as a fief of the Counts Aldobrandeschi, in a document recording the assignment of the church of St. George to Ildebrando degli Aldobrandeschi, whose successors were counts of the Grossetana Mark until the end of the 12th century.

Grosseto steadily grew in importance, owing to the decline of Rusellae and Vetulonia until it was one of the principal Tuscan cities. In 1137 the city was besieged by German troops, led by Duke Heinrich X of Bavaria, sent by the emperor Lothair III to reinstate his authority over the Aldobrandeschi. In the following year the bishopric of Roselle was transferred to Grosseto.

In 1151 the citizens swore loyalty to the Republic of Siena, and in 1222 the Aldobrandeschi gave the Grossetani the right to have their own podestà, together with three councilors and consuls. In 1244 the city was reconquered by the Sienese, and its powers, together with all the Aldobrandeschi's imperial privileges, were transferred to Siena by order of the imperial vicar. Thereafter Grosseto shared the fortunes of Siena. It became an important stronghold, and the fortress (rocca), the walls and bastions can still to be seen.

In 1266 and in 1355, Grosseto tried in vain to win freedom from the overlordship of Siena. While Guelph and Ghibelline parties struggled for control of that city, Umberto and Aldobrandino Aldobrandeschi tried to regain Grosseto for their family. The Sienese armies were, however, victorious, and in 1259 they named a podestà from their city. But Grosseto gained its freedom and in the following year and fought alongside the Florentine forces in the Battle of Montaperti.

Over the next 80 years Grosseto was again occupied, ravaged, excommunicated by Pope Clement IV, besieged by emperor Louis IV and by the antipope Nicholas V in 1328, until it finally submitted to its more powerful neighbour, Siena.

The pestilence of 1348 struck Grosseto hard and by 1369 its population had been reduced to some hundred families. Its territory, moreover, was frequently ravaged, notably in 1447 by Alfons V of Sicily and in 1455 by Jacopo Piccinino.

Sienese rule ended in 1559, when Charles V handed over the whole duchy to Cosimo I de Medici, first grand duke of Tuscany. In 1574 the construction of a line of defensive walls was begun, which are still well preserved today, while the surrounding swampy plain was drained. Grosseto, however, remained a minor town, with only 700 inhabitants at the beginning of the 18th century.

Under the rule of the House of Lorraine, Grosseto flourished. It was given the title of capital of the new Maremma province.

In 1943, the city was heavily bombed by the Allies.

Geography

Climate 
Grosseto has a Mediterranean climate with very mild wet winters and very hot dry summers. On average there are 25 nights a year where the low reaches or dips below freezing  but there are also 41 days where the high is at or surpasses . There are 12 days of fog on an average year.

Government

Subdivisions 
The Municipality of Grosseto was subdivided into eight districts (circoscrizioni) from 1977 to 2011.

Frazioni

Alberese

The name is also extended to the surrounding rural areas which go from the first foothills of the hinterland hills to the sea through the northern slopes of the Uccellina Mountains.

Batignano

Of uncertain origins, Batignano developed in the Medieval period, around the castle which controlled the outlet of the road towards Siena on the plain of Grosseto and some lead and silver mines. It was a feud of the Aldobrandeschi and in 1213 belonged to Manto da Grosseto. In the 14th century, it then passed under the dominion of Siena, hosting many immigrants from Corsica, and so in the Grand Duchy of Tuscany. In 1738 it was reunited with the comune of Grosseto.

Braccagni

Once being simply an appendix of Montepescali, Braccagni is seen today more independently as it is believed to be the nodal point of the economy of the area. The railway station, the Aurelia, many activities which have developed in the last few years, new habitations, these have all created its new identity as a modern town, in continuous evolution.

Istia d'Ombrone

The center of Istia emerged as a fortified settlement along the valley of the river Ombrone and it was owned by the bishops of Roselle since 862.

Marina di Grosseto

Once a fishing village, it is known for its hilly hinterland, rich in macchia and wide beaches overlooking the Tyrrhenian Sea, with a vast pine forest that extends from Punta Ala to Alberese.

Montepescali

Montepescali is a small town of medieval origins. The site, from which the scenic panorama of the coastal strip and the Tuscan Archipelago up to Corsica can be seen, is also known as "Terrace or balcony of the Maremma".

Principina a Mare

Principina a Mare is a seaside resort. The center, sparsely populated land in winter, consists primarily of houses of holidaymakers, hotels, high class and a camp category average. However, the location is quite popular due to its proximity to the mouth of the river Ombrone and the Natural Park of Maremma.

Principina Terra

The village of Principina Terra is located south-west of the capital city, almost halfway between the city center and the seaside resorts of Marina di Grosseto and Principina a Mare. The area surrounding the village was washed from the shores of ancient Lake Prile.

Rispescia

Roselle

Roselle, in Latin Rusellae, now a municipal frazione of Grosseto, was once the main city in the area. Of Etruscan origin, it was built on a hill that offered protection and commanded all the nearby valley. The extent of its dominion is not clear, but probably at its peak included most of the Vetulonia territory. The city's splendour ended in 294 BCE, when, according to Livy, the Roman Republic conquered it. After the end of the Roman Empire, in the 5th century, Roselle was still the most important centre of what is now southern Tuscany. Its gradual decline began in 1138, when the diocesan seat was moved to Grosseto.

Etruscan ruins had been discovered in Roselle, including cyclopean walls,  in circumference, and sulphur baths, which in the last century were restored for medicinal uses. There was formerly an amphitheatre.

Culture

Language

Literature
Andrea da Grosseto was born in Grosseto in the first half of 1200. He is very important in Italian literature, because he is considered the first writer in the Italian language. Andrea da Grosseto translated from Latin the Moral Treaties of Albertano of Brescia, in 1268. His texts were written in the Italian language, without too many redundancies and constructions, words and typical ways of speech of the vernacular and the dialect. The writer intended to not utilise his own Grossetan dialect, but to use a general "Italian national language". In fact he twice refers to the vernacular which he uses defining it italico (Italic). So Andrea da Grosseto was the first to intend to use vernacular as a national unifying language from the north to the south of the entire Peninsula.

Museums
Museo archeologico e d'arte della Maremma
Museo di storia naturale della Maremma
Museo Collezione Gianfranco Luzzetti

Cinema
Grosseto and Maremma have been settings for numerous works of fiction and movies, including the novels and associated films, such as The Easy Life (1962) with Vittorio Gassman; La vita agra (1964), from the novel of the same name by Luciano Bianciardi, with Ugo Tognazzi; An Ideal Place To Kill (1969) directed by Umberto Lenzi; In viaggio con papà (1982), with Alberto Sordi; Nothing Left to Do But Cry (1984), with Massimo Troisi and Roberto Benigni; It's Happening Tomorrow (1988); Viola bacia tutti (1997) with Asia Argento; The Talented Mr. Ripley with Matt Damon and Jude Law; Emma sono io (2002); Roberto Benigni's Pinocchio; Manuale d'amore 3 (2011) with Robert De Niro and Monica Bellucci; Swiss movie Summer Games, and some Leonardo Pieraccioni's movies. Famous Italian actress Elsa Martinelli and actor Luigi Pistilli were both born in Grosseto. Actress Laura Morante was born in Santa Fiora, and director Umberto Lenzi in Massa Marittima, both in the province of Grosseto.

Cuisine
Schiaccia alla pala (oven-baked bread with oil) and Schiaccia con cipolle e acciughe (oven-baked bread with onions and European anchovy) are typical breads of the city of Grosseto. Acquacotta is typical of Mount Amiata: it is a poor soup, and the main ingredients are artichokes, broccoli, cabbage, beans, borage, pisciacane (dandelion) and similar vegetables. The Maremmana cattle is one of the two breeds used in the preparation of the florentine steak.

Main sights

The Medicean Walls

The walls were commissioned by Cosimo I de Medici in 1564, in order to replace those from the 12th-14th centuries, as part of his policy of making Grosseto a stronghold to protect his southern border. The design was by Baldassarre Lanci, and construction began in 1565. Until 1757 the exterior was surrounded by a ditch with an earthen moat. There were two main gates: Porta Nuova on the north and Porta Reale (now Porta Vecchia) on the south.

The walls are now used as a public park and walking area.

Religious architecture

Cathedral

The Romanesque cathedral, the main monument of the city, is named for its patron St. Lawrence, and was begun at the end of the 13th century, by architect Sozzo Rustichini of Siena. Erected over the earlier church of Santa Maria Assunta, it was only finished in the 15th century (mainly due to the continuing struggles against Siena).

The façade of alternate layers of white and black marble is Romanesque in style, but is almost entirely the result of 16th century and 1816–1855 restorations: it retains decorative parts of the originary buildings, including Evangelists' symbols. The layout consists of a Latin cross, with transept and apse. The interior has a nave with two aisles, separated by cruciform pilasters. The main artworks are a wondrously carved baptismal font from 1470–1474 and the Madonna delle Grazie by Matteo di Giovanni (1470).

The campanile (bell tower) was finished in 1402, and restored in 1911.

Churches in the city centre

Church of San Francesco. Situated in its homonymous square, it was built in the 13th century, initially an important Benedictine, later Franciscan convent. The complex underwent several restorations and reconstructions: the bell was rebuilt in the first half of the 20th century. Very characteristic is the wooden tabernacle that stands on the front and inside there are works of art from various historical periods. At the center of the cloister stands the characteristic Pozzo della Bufala (Well of the Buffalo) in travertine; another well is located in the square outside the church.
Convent of Clarisse. Located on strada Vinzaglio, the convent is annexed to the Church of Bigi. The convent of Clarisse and the church of Bigi are now deconsecrated. The entire complex is characterized by the probable medieval origins, which was followed by a series of restorations in Baroque style in the 17th century. Today the convent hosts the Museolab Città di Grosseto and the university.
Church of San Pietro. The oldest religious building in town, it was built along the stretch of the Via Aurelia that crossed the center and was originally a plebeian and stational church along the old consular road.
Church of Misericordia (19th century). It belonged to various religious orders during the following centuries, before moving on brotherhood in the early decades of the 19th century. In the past, there were several well-preserved works of art currently on display in the section on Sacred Art of the Archaeological and Art Museum of Maremma.

Churches outside the city walls
Sacro Cuore di Gesù, a minor basilica built in 1958, it was designed by engineer Ernesto Ganelli and it is located along via della Pace.
Medaglia Miracolosa, built in the early 20th century behind the Palazzo delle Poste in a neo-Romanesque style. It has a bell tower.
San Giuseppe, located in the western part of the urban area, it was built in the 1930s in neo-Romanesque style, divided into three naves. The capitals are adorned with very fine and decorative features.
San Giuseppe Benedetto Cottolengo, built on the eastern end of the urban area around the middle of last century, the style is neo-Romanesque, it is flanked by a bell tower and preceded by steps and a porch. It was designed by engineer Ernesto Ganelli in 1951.
Maria Santissima Addolorata, built in the 1970s in the neighbourhood of Gorarella, it was designed by architect Carlo Boccianti.
Santissimo Crocifisso, a modern church situated in an area called Cittadella dello Studente, it was designed by Carlo Boccianti.
Santa Lucia, a modern church situated in the neighbourhood of Barbanella.
Santa Teresa, built in the 2000s (decade) and consecrated in 2006, it is situated in an area called Cittadella, on the northern part of the urban area.

Abbeys
Abbey of San Rabano, at the southern end of the town of Grosseto in the heart of the Natural Park of Maremma. It was built in the Middle Ages as a Benedictine monastery, passed after the Order of the Knights of Jerusalem and it was finally abandoned in the 16th century.
Abbey of San Pancrazio al Fango, situated between Grosseto and Castiglione della Pescaia, in the heart of Nature Reserve Diaccia Botrona, not far from the Fattoria della Badiola. The church, which is in the form of ruins, was built in the Middle Ages on a slight hill overlooking the surrounding wetlands, once occupied by Prile Lake near a building from Roman times.

Civil architecture

Palazzi

Within the walls of Grosseto are the following buildings:

Palazzo Aldobrandeschi. Of medieval origins, it was almost entirely rebuilt in the early 19th century. It is now a Neo-Gothic edifice with ogival mullioned windows and merlons in the upper part of the walls. It houses the seat of the province of Grosseto. The architect was Lorenzo Porciatti.
Palazzo Comunale (Town hall), located on the north side of piazza Dante, to the left of the churchyard of the Cathedral. It was built between 1870 and 1873.
Episcopal Palace. It hosts the offices and the curia of the Roman Catholic Diocese of Grosseto.
Palace of the former Convent (15th century), originally used as an unidentified convent structure.
Palace of Monte dei Paschi, built at the turn of the 20th century, it is a neo-Renaissance palace designed by Vittorio Mariani, with a large arms of the bank placed on its main façade.
Cassero del Sale, built during the 14th century as the point of production, distribution and export of salt coming from the salt marshes that once existed along the coast. For several centuries has hosted, therefore, the Customs Officer to control all activities related to production and trade of salt.
Former Misericordia Hospital, a complex on three levels from the 18th century. Now the building hosts the university center of Grosseto.
Former Palace of Banca d'Italia. Overlooking the southern side of piazza Socci, along Corso Carducci, it was renovated in the early 20th century to be the seat of the provincial Bank of Italy, then transferred out of the walls of Grosseto in a more modern and complex building.
Grand Hotel Bastiani, located in an impressive neoclassical style palace that facing on via Manin, with a short road that leads toward piazza Dante.
Palace of the Old Court, seat of the Museo archeologico e d'arte della Maremma since 1975, overlooking the south side of piazza Baccarini. The present building, formerly courthouse, was built in neo Renaissance in the second half of 19th century replacing an existing building of medieval origin.
Palazzo del Genio Civile, typical building located along Corso Carducci, it is adjacent to Palazzo Tognetti, which is in continuity with the right side. Built in the early 20th century, it shows fine decorations that recall both the neo-Renaissance and the Art Nouveau style.
Palazzo Chiarini, its present appearance dates back to the 17th century. The building has three levels, with round-arched entrance portal on the ground floor dominated by arms.
Palazzo Tognetti, an Art Nouveau style building on three levels located at an angle along Corso Carducci just before piazza Socci.
Palazzo Moschini, located in piazza Socci, it is a building of medieval origins, restored in the Renaissance and completely renovated during the 19th century. Currently, it houses the State Archives.
Palazzo Carmignani, a landmark building built in the 20th century, it presents a trapezoidal shape, appearing between piazza del Sale, strada Ricasoli and via Mazzini.
Palazzo Chiarini, located in via dell'Unione, its present appearance dates back to the 17th century. The building has three levels, with round-arched entrance portal on the ground floor dominated by arms.
Palazzo Berti. Overlooking on Corso Carducci in the front of the Church of San Pietro, it is a stately and elegant building built on four levels. Built in the Middle Ages, its current appearance is due to restructuring in the second half of the 19th century.
Palazzo Cappelli, located along Corso Carducci to the right of the Church of San Pietro, it is presented in an attractive neoclassical style.
Palazzo Pallini, an art nouveau building of the early 20th century, it is located along Corso Carducci. Very valuable are the decorations that adorn the façade.
Palazzo Mensini, built in 1898, it is the seat of the Biblioteca Chelliana.
Casa del Fascio, also known as the Palazzo Littorio, it was built during Fascism in the traditional architectural principles with the characteristic tower. In the past, it hosted the Casa del Fascio (Fascist House), but now it is headquarters of the Guardia di Finanza.

Outside the walls of Grosseto are the following buildings:

Villino Pastorelli, built between 1908 and 1913 by the architect Lorenzo Porciatti as the residence of the wealthy family of Millanta. The building was later owned by advocate Pastorelli, which retains the name. Purchased by the Banca Nazionale dell'Agricoltura after the war, suffered between 1948 and 1949 substantial changes, including the extension of the back.
Villino Panichi, located in Piazza della Vasca on the corner of via IV Novembre, the building was built in early 20th century designed by the architect Lorenzo Porciatti, whose name was given by the family who lived there originally.
Villino Guastini, built in 1928 by the architect Pistelli and located on via Matteotti, it is an Art Nouveau style house with a floor used as storage of agricultural machinery.
Former Boarding School Magistrale, known as Scuola Media Giovanni Pascoli, located in Piazza della Vasca, it was built in 1923 by the engineer Giuseppe Luciani to accommodate boarding and a school.
Palazzo delle Poste (Post Office), located on Piazza della Vasca, it was designed by the architect Angiolo Mazzoni in 1930, as a symbol of Fascist architecture.
Palazzo del Governo, located on Piazza della Vasca, it was designed by Vittorio Mariani and built in 1927.
Complesso polifunzionale Cosimini, located on Piazza della Vasca, it is a multipurpose facility (bank, offices, apartments and shops) designed by Ludovico Quaroni.

Theatres
Teatro degli Industri, located along via Mazzini, just beyond the palace of the Grand Hotel Bastiani but on the side facing toward the walls of Grosseto, it is an old building rebuilt in the 19th century. It is one of the main sites of the culture of Grosseto.
Teatro Moderno, a modern theatre located outside the city walls. It was used for the trial against Francesco Schettino in 2014/15.

Monuments
Canapone Monument, a sculpture dedicated to the Grand Duke Leopold II of Lorraine, located in the center of Piazza Dante, at the spot where formerly stood a well-cistern for water.
Roman column, located at the corner of the main façade and the right side of the Cathedral, it was brought in Piazza Dante in Middle Ages from nearby Roselle before its final abandonment.
Unknown Soldier Monument, built in 1921, it is located along the walls, on the Rimembranza bastion. It honors the victims of World War I and World War II.
Andrea da Grosseto Monument, made between 1973 and 1974 by sculptor Arnaldo Mazzanti, it is located in Piazza Baccarini, opposite the Archeological Museum, in honor of Andrea da Grosseto, the distinguished scholar who in 1268 translated the Moral Treatises of Albertanus of Brescia by providing a first example of Italian literary prose.
Ettore Socci Monument, built in 1907 by Emilio Gallori in honor of Ettore Socci, a Republican, an honorary citizen and member of the College of Grosseto.
Well of Spedale, made during the 15th century, it is located in Piazza San Francesco in front of the right lateral side of the Church of San Francesco.
Well of Buffalo, located in the courtyard of the cloister of San Francesco, was built by the Medici to replace an existing well to supply water to the men who lived in the convent.
Well of Fortezza, located in Piazza d'Armi inside the Fortezza bastion that surrounds the fortified Citadel, it was built in the 16th century for supply water of the guards stationed there.

Others
The Etruscan site of Roselle.
Medieval buildings in the frazioni of Batignano, Istia d'Ombrone and Montepescali.
Granducal villa of Alberese, built by the Knights Hospitaller in the 15th century, and later used as residence by the Grand Dukes of Tuscany.

Sports
Grosseto has enjoyed a long tradition in sports. Baseball and football are perhaps the most popular in Grosseto. However, other sports such as American football, cricket, horse racing and athletics are also widely practised.

The premier society of men's baseball in Grosseto is called Bbc Grosseto Orioles (also referred to by its sponsored name of Montepaschi). Grosseto participates in the highest level of play in Italy, Serie A1, and it won the national championship in 1986, 1989, 2004 and 2007. The team won the European Cup in 2005. Montedeipaschi Grosseto hosts his home games at Stadio Roberto Jannella.

The Unione Sportiva Grosseto Football Club was founded in 1912. It has participated in the National Championship of Soccer in Serie B (the second level of the Italian soccer leagues) since the 2007–2008 season. The football club U.S. Grosseto hosts its games at the Stadio Carlo Zecchini.

Other important teams are the Maremma Cricket Club (Serie A) and American Football Condor Grosseto (Serie B).

Horse racing is of considerable importance, with several races throughout the year that, in summer, often taking place at night. The sports facility where are played the various races is the hippodrome Casalone, located in the south of the city, at the beginning of the road that leads to Principina a Mare.

The city is also a major center for athletics: Stadio Carlo Zecchini has in fact hosted the European Junior Championships in 2001 and World Junior Championships in 2004.

Grosseto in 2006 was also the headquarters of the World Military Fencing Championships.

Transportation

Trains
The city is served by the Pisa-Livorno-Rome railway line connecting Genoa to the capital and serves as the terminus of trains on the single track branch line from Grosseto via Monte Antico to Siena, where it converges with a line from Chiusi and proceeds north to Empoli and Florence.

Here is the list of railway stations in the city of Grosseto:

 Grosseto Station, situated along the Pisa-Livorno-Roma line, it is also the terminus of the Siena-Grosseto line. It is the main railway station of the city, which serves the city center and the urban area.
 Montepescali Station, located at the northern limits of the municipality, at the point of bifurcation between the Pisa-Livorno-Rome railway and the branch line towards Siena.
 Alberese Station, located along the railway Pisa-Livorno-Roma to the southern limits of the municipal area, since 2010 only served by buses.
 Rispescia Station, now disused, situated near the village of Rispescia and was a place of occasional stop for regional trains.

Buses
Local bus service in Grosseto was managed by Tiemme Toscana Mobilità one of the companies of the consortium ONE Scarl to accomplish the contract stipulated with the Regione Toscana for the public transport in the 2018-2019 period. Intercity buses depart from the main bus station in Piazza Marconi. There are also several bus services going from the city to Florence, Siena and other cities in Tuscany. A network of urban bus routes also operates in Grosseto, and the bus station serves as an interchange point between these, the intercity routes and extra-urban routes which extend into the rest of the Province of Grosseto.

Since 1 November 2021 the public local transport is operated by Autolinee Toscane.

Port
The city has a modern tourist dock opened in 2004 in the seaside resort of Marina di Grosseto, at the mouth of the San Rocco Canal. For passenger traffic in the medium range, the main port is Porto Santo Stefano (40 km), with ferry only for the islands of Giglio and Giannutri.

Airport
Grosseto and the Maremma are served by Grosseto Baccarini Airport, located midway between the capital and Marina di Grosseto. The airport is a military site which is also used as a commercial airport by civilian charter flights and private aircraft, and has a small terminal to accommodate these.

With regard to domestic and international flights, the airports of reference are the airports of Florence, Pisa and Rome-Fiumicino. For a few months in 2018, the airport was served by a flight to Bern, operated by SkyWork Airlines, until it went into liquidation.

Notable residents
Andrea da Grosseto (13th century), writer and translator
Luciano Bianciardi (1922–1971), novelist
Blind Fool Love (2005-2012), post-hardcore band
Jessica Brando (1994), singer
Carlo Cassola (1917–1987), novelist, lived in Grosseto from 1948 to 1971
Lucio Corsi (1993), singer-songwriter
Francesco Falaschi (1961), film director and screenwriter
Francesco Falconi (1976), fantasy writer
Frederick II, Holy Roman Emperor (1194-1250), lived in Grosseto in the winters of 1243, 1244, 1245 and 1246
Egisto Macchi (1928–1992), composer
Elsa Martinelli (1935-2017), actress
Francesco Mori (1975), painter
Oreste Piccioni (1915–2002), physicist
Luigi Pistilli (1929–1996), actor
Quartiere Coffee (2004), reggae band
Alessandra Sensini (1970), windsurfer, winner of four medals in the Olympic Games (1996, 2000, 2004, 2008)

International relations

Twin towns – sister cities
Grosseto is twinned with:

 Birkirkara, Malta
 Cottbus, Germany
 Dimitrovgrad, Bulgaria
 Kashiwara, Japan
 Montreuil, France
 Narbonne, France
 Saintes-Maries-de-la-Mer, France

See also
Diocese of Grosseto
Andrea of Grosseto

Sources and references

External link

 
Grosseto Catholic Encyclopedia article
About Grosseto

 
Coastal towns in Tuscany